The Farrell Area School District is a diminutive, rural, public school district serving parts of Mercer County, Pennsylvania. Farrell Area School District encompasses approximately   including: the communities of Farrell and Wheatland, both of which are adjacent to the much larger Sharon, Pennsylvania. According to 2000 federal census data, it serves a resident population of 6,798. By 2010, the district's population declined to 5,739 people. In 2009, Farrell Area School District residents' per capita income was $14,623, while the median family income was $29,821.

Farrell Area School District operates one elementary school and a combined junior/senior high school.

Extracurriculars
Farrell Area School District offers a variety of clubs, activities and an extensive sports program.

Sports
The district funds:

Boys
Basketball- A
Football - A
Swimming and Diving - A
Track and Field - A
Volleyball - AA

Girls
Basketball - A
Softball - A
Swimming and Diving - AA
Track and Field - AA
Volleyball - A

Junior High School Sports

Boys
Basketball
Football
Track and Field
Volleyball

Girls
Basketball
Track and Field
Volleyball

According to PIAA directory July 2013 

The Farrell Steelers have won 21 PIAA State Championships (8 girls volleyball, 7 boys basketball, 3 wrestling, 2 football, 1 girls track). The Steelers have also won a PA record 7 PIAA State Championships in boys basketball (1952,1954,1956,1959,1960,1969 and 1972) as well as a WPIAL record 13 WPIAL boys basketball championships (1951,1952,1954,1956,1959,1960,1969,1971,1972,1974,1976,1984,1992). Former coach Ed McCluskey led the school to all 7 state titles and is widely considered to be one of the best basketball coaches ever. He coached numerous Division 1 and professional players. The girls volleyball program won 8 PIAA state championships in the 1980s, 1990s, and 2000s under Harriett Morrison.

References

School districts in Mercer County, Pennsylvania